The Calm is the third studio album by American DJ and producer Kaskade. It was released on March 30, 2006, by Quiet City Recordings. In 2014, it was announced that the album was published on YouTube.

Track listing

References

External links
 The Calm at Discogs

2006 albums
Kaskade albums
Electronic rock albums by American artists